Thomas Francis O'Byrne (30 August 1871 – 30 September 1952) was a New Zealand timber worker, trade unionist and politician. He was born in Westbury, Tasmania, Australia in 1871. From 1934 onwards, he was a member of the Legislative Council.

In 1935, he was awarded the King George V Silver Jubilee Medal.

References

1871 births
1952 deaths
People from Westbury, Tasmania
Members of the New Zealand Legislative Council
Australian emigrants to New Zealand
New Zealand Labour Party MLCs
Social Democratic Party (New Zealand) politicians
United Labour Party (New Zealand) politicians
Invercargill City Councillors
Burials at Eastern Cemetery, Invercargill